Michel Raymond "Bunny" Larocque (April 6, 1952 – July 29, 1992) was a Canadian professional ice hockey goaltender who played for the Montreal Canadiens, Toronto Maple Leafs, Philadelphia Flyers and St. Louis Blues in the National Hockey League. He was a four-time Stanley Cup winner with the Montreal Canadiens.

Playing career
Larocque played junior hockey with the Ottawa 67's of the Ontario Hockey Association (OHA) from 1968 to 1972, and led the league in shutouts for the last three of those years. He was also one of the most penalized goalies, and was regularly involved in fights. In 1972, he was selected sixth overall by the Montreal Canadiens in the 1972 NHL Amateur Draft. In 1973 he played with the Nova Scotia Voyageurs of the American Hockey League (AHL), his first taste of professional hockey. For his outstanding play, Larocque was awarded the Hap Holmes Memorial Award with teammate Michel Deguise, and was selected to the Second All-Star Team.

Larocque started his National Hockey League (NHL) career in 1974 with the Canadiens. That was the season that Ken Dryden, one of the top goalies in that era, sat out to complete his law degree. Larocque shared playing time during the season with Michel Plasse and Wayne Thomas, but was the starting goalie in the playoffs. Dryden returned in 1975, and Larocque settled down as his back-up, sharing four Vezina Trophy wins, in an era when the award was given to the principal goalies on the team allowing the fewest goals in the regular season. The first three were largely because of Dryden's all-star play. In 1977, Larocque led the NHL with a 2.09 goals against average, but with Dryden ahead of him in the Canadiens net, he only managed to play 26 games. The Canadiens won four Stanley Cups during that stretch, but Larocque's only action in the playoff was for one period in the 1979 playoffs; Dryden was in front of the nets the rest of the time. The Stanley Cup wins were in 1976, 1977, 1978 and 1979.

In 1979, Dryden retired. Larocque saw more action as a result, and won his fourth and final Vezina Trophy, sharing duties with Richard Sévigny and newly-acquired Denis Herron in 1981. Near the trade deadline during that season, he was traded to the Toronto Maple Leafs for defenceman Robert Picard. Larocque played 50 games the following season with a struggling Leafs team. Larocque was in net when the Buffalo Sabres scored a NHL record of 9 goals in one period in a 14-4 game. He was again traded, this time to the Philadelphia Flyers in 1983, in return for goaltender Rick St. Croix, and finished his NHL career with the St. Louis Blues in 1984 after being sold by the Flyers, who had settled on Pelle Lindbergh in goal. Larocque retired from hockey in 1985 after playing 13 games with the Peoria Rivermen in the International Hockey League (IHL).

Nickname
Larocque reputedly acquired the nickname "Bunny" as an infant.  It was his mother's pet name for him which stuck for the rest of his life.

Retirement and death
After his playing career ended, he served as general manager of the Victoriaville Tigres of the Quebec Major Junior Hockey League (QMJHL) during the 1989–90 season and won QMJHL executive of the year for 1989–90. He was vice president of the QMJHL during the 1991–92 season and still held the position at time of his death.

He died of brain cancer at age 40 in his hometown of Hull, Quebec.

Awards and achievements
 Selected to the OHA-Jr. Second All-Star Team in 1971.
 Selected to the OHA-Jr. First All-Star Team in 1972.
 Hap Holmes Memorial Award winner in 1973 (shared with Michel Deguise).
 Selected to the AHL Second All-Star Team in 1973.
 Vezina Trophy winner in 1977, 1978 and 1979 (all shared with Ken Dryden); 1981 (shared with Denis Herron and Richard Sevigny).
 Stanley Cup championship in 1976, 1977, 1978, 1979.
 John Horman Trophy winner in 1990.

Career statistics

Regular season and playoffs

External links
 
 Official Canadiens History Site
 Hockey Draft Central
 Society for International Hockey Research

1952 births
1992 deaths
Canadian ice hockey goaltenders
Deaths from brain tumor
Deaths from cancer in Quebec
Ice hockey people from Gatineau
Montreal Canadiens draft picks
Montreal Canadiens players
National Hockey League first-round draft picks
Nova Scotia Voyageurs players
Ottawa 67's players
Peoria Rivermen (IHL) players
Philadelphia Flyers players
St. Louis Blues players
Springfield Indians players
Stanley Cup champions
Toronto Maple Leafs players
Vezina Trophy winners